Skell is American slang for a homeless person or a vagrant.

Skell may also refer to:
 Philip Skell, American chemist
 River Skell, England
 SkELL, a language learning tool
 Skell (mythology), a Native American god

See also
 Skel (disambiguation)